Walter Richard Austen Hudson (8 December 1894 – 21 August 1970) 
was a Conservative Party politician in the United Kingdom.

He was elected as Member of Parliament (MP) for Kingston upon Hull North at the 1950 general election, and held the seat until he retired from the House of Commons at the 1959 general election.

References

External links 
 

1894 births
1970 deaths
Conservative Party (UK) MPs for English constituencies
UK MPs 1950–1951
UK MPs 1951–1955
UK MPs 1955–1959